Horseshoe Branch (also called Horse Shoe Creek) is a stream in the U.S. state of Missouri. It is a tributary of the North Fork Salt River.

Horseshoe Branch was so named on account of its course having the shape of a horseshoe.

See also
List of rivers of Missouri

References

Rivers of Monroe County, Missouri
Rivers of Shelby County, Missouri
Rivers of Missouri